The Thetis-class ocean patrol vessels or ocean patrol frigates, also called Stanflex 3000, is a class of large patrol vessels built for the Royal Danish Navy. The class comprises four ships, all built and commissioned in the early 1990s. The ships' tasks are mainly maintenance of sovereignty, search and rescue, fishery inspection and support to local (mainly Greenlandic) authorities. The operation areas are normally Greenland and the Faroe Islands, but the vessels also operate near Iceland on transit between Greenland and the Faroe Islands, and near Denmark.

Design
The ships each have double-skinned ice-reinforced hulls so that the ships can break through  of solid ice. Thetis has undergone a conversion, first to participate in the CANUMAS-project, and later to become the fleet's flagship, a role that ended in September 2007. Thetis is fitted with Terma C-Flex Combat Management System. The Danish Navy has retrofitted the vessels with  heavy machine guns, Stinger launchers and decoy launching systems. The ships can carry and use multiple StanFlex mission modules.

In the most common role (ocean patrol), the standard base crew is 47 people and 16 conscripts, but in either command ship role or more warfare heavy roles, the base crew is expanded to 60 people plus 4 aircrew for the Westland Lynx Mk.90B and one or two doctors. Accommodation is available for 101 personnel in all.

List of ships

Citations

References
 Wertheim, Eric. The Naval Institute Guide to Combat Fleets of the World, 2005–2006; Their Ships, Aircraft, and Systems. US Naval Institute Press. Annapolis, Maryland. 2005.

External links

 Thetis class (from Naval Technology)
 Thetis class (From Royal Danish Navy)

Frigate classes
 
Patrol ship classes
Frigates of the Royal Danish Navy